"Born Slippy .NUXX" is a song by the British electronic music group Underworld. It was first released as the B-side to "Born Slippy", in May 1995. The fragmented lyrics, by vocalist Karl Hyde, describe the perspective of an alcoholic.

After it was used in the 1996 film Trainspotting, "Born Slippy .NUXX" was issued as a single on 1 July 1996 and reached number two on the UK Singles Chart. It has been named one of the best tracks of the 1990s by numerous publications.

Writing
The Underworld vocalist, Karl Hyde, wrote the lyrics for "Born Slippy .NUXX" after a night drinking in Soho, London, hoping to capture the way a drunk "sees the world in fragments". The vocals were recorded in one take; when Hyde lost his place, he would sing the same line repeatedly, creating the line "lager, lager, lager, lager". Hyde, who was struggling with alcoholism, said he did not intend the song to be a "drinking anthem" but rather a "cry for help". He was disturbed when audience members raised their lager cans during performances. The Underworld producer Rick Smith said the lyrics reflected "this energy of movement, and of time and place", likening them to an abstract painting.

Release
Underworld released "Born Slippy .NUXX" in the UK on 1 May 1995, as the B-side to a different track, "Born Slippy". "Born Slippy. NUXX" was used in the film Trainspotting, released in February 1996 in the UK. The director, Danny Boyle, described it as the "heartbeat" of the film, capturing its "euphoric highs following intense lows". Underworld initially refused permission to use it in the film, as they disliked how their music was often used in negative portrayals of clubbing, but Boyle persuaded them after showing them a clip.

"Born Slippy .NUXX" was reissued as a single in the UK on 1 July 1996. Boosted by Trainspotting, it reached number two on the UK Singles Chart. Smith was shocked when BBC Radio 1 played the track on breakfast radio, and said: "I thought, music is moving, culture is moving, it's spreading. It's meaning things outside of just the context of on an amazing sound system in a club or on a PA system in a student hall. It was very nice!" The reissue was released in the United States in October 1996.

Critical reception
On the 1995 release, Brad Beatnik of Music Week  wrote, "Messrs Emerson, Hyde and Smith bung a few breakbeats on board for a dazzling ride through rich, colourful techno terrains. For the first minute, you might think the boys have gone all jungle on us but no – those lush synths cruise in to perfectly balance the thwacking beats." Music Week gave the track five out of five in 1996, describing it as "an anthem for a generation".

Impact and legacy
AllMusic wrote that "Born Slippy .NUXX" was "simply one of the best slices of electronica one will find. Musically austere in its emotional textures, the song becomes a nearly unstoppable force ... Dance music is rarely so artistic and enjoyable in the same instance." In 2017, Vice described "Born Slippy .NUXX" as one of the 90s' most iconic songs, writing that it "mixed sublime synths with a four-to-the-floor freakout, and represented everything that was going on; it was new."

In 2004, Mixmag readers voted "Born Slippy .NUXX" the fourth-best dance track, and in 2011 Slant Magazine named it the 95th-best single of the decade. In 2014, NME named it the 261st-greatest song. In 2010, Pitchfork named it the 31st best track of the 1990s; in a redux of this list in 2022, they named it the 20th-best. The Guardian named it the "most experimental and sonically extreme hit of the 90s", alongside the Chemical Brothers' 1996 single "Setting Sun", and among "the weirdest chart hits of all time".

For the film T2 Trainspotting (2017), Smith created a new version with timestretched chords, "Slow Slippy". He said in 2017, "We’ve been playing 'Born Slippy' live for 20 years, and the reaction from the audience is so strong it's almost overwhelming. It's never got tiring to perform or play. It's what it triggers in people."

Track listing
Durations vary across releases.

Charts and certifications

Weekly charts

Year-end charts

Certifications

"Born Slippy .NUXX 2003"

"Born Slippy .NUXX 2003" is a version of "Born Slippy .NUXX" re-released by Underworld to promote the album 1992–2002, originally released in 2003.  New remixes were commissioned for this release, along with a new video, compiled by Danny Boyle of clips from his film Trainspotting. This release reached No. 1 on the UK Dance Singles Chart during the first week of November 2003.

Track listings

Charts

References

1996 singles
1996 songs
1999 singles
2003 singles
Dance Pool singles
Logic Records singles
Number-one singles in Italy
Songs written by Darren Emerson
Songs written by Karl Hyde
Songs written by Rick Smith (musician)
TVT Records singles
Underworld (band) songs
V2 Records singles
Wax Trax! Records singles